David Lyons (born February 6, 1935) is an American moral, political and legal philosopher who is emeritus professor of philosophy and of law at Boston University.

Education and career

Lyons earned his Ph.D. in philosophy from Harvard University where he studied under John Rawls.  He taught at Cornell University from 1964 until 1995, when he joined the BU faculty.  His former students include David O. Brink.

Philosophical Work

He is particularly well known for his interpretation of the philosophy of John Stuart Mill, arguing that Mill's utilitarianism is compatible with recognizing the importance of rights.

Books
Moral Aspects of Legal Theory : Essays on Law, Justice and Political Responsibility. Cambridge : Cambridge University Press, 1999.  ISBN   
Translated into  Spanish as Aspectos morales de la teoria juridica : ensayos sobre la ley, la justicia y la responsabilidad política 
Mill's Utilitarianism : Critical Essays (editor)  Lanham (Md.) : Rowman & Littlefield, 1997.   
Rights, Welfare, and Mill's Moral Theory. New York: Oxford University Press, 1994.  
Ethics and the Rule of Law. Cambridge [Cambridgeshire]: Cambridge University Press, 1984.   Held in over 1000 worldCat libraries.
Translated into Polish as Etyka i rządy prawa 
Rights. (editor) The Wadsworth series in social philosophy. Belmont, Calif: Wadsworth Pub. Co, 1979.   
 Translated into  Spanish as Ética y derecho 
In the Interest of the Governed; A Study in Bentham's philosophy of utility and law. Oxford, Clarendon Press, 1973.   
Forms and Limits of Utilitarianism. Oxford: Clarendon Press, 1965.

References

External links
 Personal page on the Boston U. website 

1935 births
20th-century American essayists
20th-century American non-fiction writers
20th-century American philosophers
21st-century American essayists
21st-century American non-fiction writers
21st-century American philosophers
American ethicists
American legal scholars
American legal writers
American male essayists
American male non-fiction writers
American philosophy academics
Analytic philosophers
Boston University faculty
Continental philosophers
Cornell University faculty
Harvard Graduate School of Arts and Sciences alumni
Living people
Philosophers of law
Philosophers of social science
Philosophy writers
Political philosophers
Social philosophers